Pomeroy or De La Pommeraie is a surname documented from the 11th century. Currently spelled as Pomeroy and the many variations which have occurred over time and geopolitical location. These variations include Pomroy, Pomery, Pumroy, Pummery, Pummeroy, de Pomerai, de Pomeroy, and Pommery.

Etymology
Despite the clearly found words of pomme and roy in the name, meaning "apple" in French and "king" in Old French (French roi), the surname given to Radulphus is not linked with the Old French word roy, but is the common place-name Pommeraye, that means "orchard of apple-trees", Modern French word , from pommier "apple-tree" and old suffix -aye, now -aie, meaning "a collection of trees". Originally the suffix -aye was masculine  : -ey, -ay and sometimes -oy. The secondary phonetic shift -ey > -oy is normally typical of Picard and the Eastern dialects of Langue d'oïl, but can sometimes be observed in Normandy.

Origins of the family 
There are several La Pommeraye in Normandy, but the sources mention generally two possible birth places of the family, both in Lower Normandy.

One in the Cotentin Peninsula on the commune of Saint-Sauveur-la-Pommeraye, now in the Manche département, 12 km from Granville.
  	 	
The other possible location is La Pommeraye, commune of the Calvados département between Thury-Harcourt and Pont-d'Ouilly (35 km south from Caen). The château Ganne at La Pommeraye is believed to be the original seat of the family and the de la Pomeroi founded the Val Abbey at Saint-Omer, Calvados.

History 

Following the Norman conquest of England, Radulph[us] de la Pomeray is found in the Domesday Book (1086) holding numerous properties as Lord or Tenant-in-chief; 98 in Devon, 2 in Somerset, and 1 in Cornwall.  His holdings included a castle at Berry Pomeroy, of which the family retained possession until the second year of the reign of King Edward VI, Henry VIII's son, and the Prayer Book Rebellion in 1549 when the castle was sold to Edward Seymour, Duke of Somerset.

List of people with this surname
 Allan Pomeroy (1907-1966), mayor of Seattle from 1952 to 1956
 Arthur Pomeroy, 1st Viscount Harberton (1723-1798), Irish politician
 Ben Pomeroy (born 1984), Australian rugby player
 Charles Pomeroy (1825–1891), US congressman from Iowa
 Dave Pomeroy (born 1956), Nashville vocalist, songwriter, producer, and bassist
 Duane Pomeroy (born 1952), American politician from Kansas
 Earl Pomeroy (born 1952), American politician from North Dakota
 Earl S. Pomeroy (1915-2005), American Historian
 Elsie Lower Pomeroy (1882–1971), American botanical illustrator and painter
 F. W. Pomeroy (Frederick William Pomeroy, 1856–1924), British sculptor
 Florence Wallace Pomeroy, Viscountess Harberton (1843-1911), British dress reformer
 Henry Pomeroy, 2nd Viscount Harberton (1749-1829), Irish politician
 Herb Pomeroy (1930–2007), American musician
 Jesse Pomeroy (1859–1932), American killer
 Jim Pomeroy (disambiguation), several people:
 Jim Pomeroy (motorcyclist) (1952–2006), professional motocross racer
 Jim Pomeroy (politician) (born 1936), member of the North Dakota Senate
 Jim Pomeroy (artist) (1945–1992), American artist
 John Pomeroy (disambiguation), several people
John Pomeroy, American animator
John Norton Pomeroy, American lawyer
John Pomeroy (British Army officer)
John Pomeroy (died 1416), MP for Totnes
 Julia Pomeroy, American actress and author
 Ken Pomeroy, creator of college basketball website and statistical archive
 Laurence Pomeroy (1883–1941), British automotive engineer
 Lawrence R. Pomeroy (1925–2020), American zoologist, ecologist, and oceanography
 Leslie Wing Pomeroy, American actress
 Louise Pomeroy (c. 1853–1893), American Shakespearean actress
 Marcus M. Pomeroy, American newspaperman
 Martin H. Pomeroy, interim Chief of Police of the Los Angeles Police Department
 Ralph Pomeroy (disambiguation), several people
 Robert Watson Pomeroy (1902–1989), New York politician
 Samuel C. Pomeroy (1816–1891), American politician from Kansas and railroad businessman
 Sarah B. Pomeroy (1938–), American classicist
 Seth Pomeroy (1706–1777), American gunsmith and soldier
 Theodore Medad Pomeroy (1824–1905), US congressman from New York
 Wardell Pomeroy (1913–2001), American sexologist
 Wesley Pomeroy (1920–1998), American lawyer and public servant
 William J. Pomeroy (1916–2009), American communist

See also
 Viscount Harberton, a title of nobility held by the Pomeroy family since 1791
 Pomeroy (disambiguation)

References

The Domesday Survey
A.A. Pomeroy : Romance and History of Eltweed Pomeroy's Ancestors in Normandy and England 1909

External links
 Pomeroy connections on Google
 Thomas Pomeroy on Ancestry.com

Surnames of Norman origin
French-language surnames